Knox is an at-grade light rail station on the W Line of the RTD Rail system. It is located alongside the banks of the Lakewood Gulch at its intersection with Knox Court, after which the station is named. The station straddles the border between Denver and Lakewood, Colorado, but RTD lists the station as being in the city of Denver. A marking etched into the platform indicates the border location.

The station opened on April 26, 2013, on the West Corridor, built as part of the Regional Transportation District (RTD) FasTracks public transportation expansion plan and voter-approved sales tax increase for the Denver metropolitan area.

The station has stops for RTD Bus routes and has seen transit-oriented development, including a large apartment building.

References 

RTD light rail stations in Denver
W Line (RTD)
Railway stations in the United States opened in 2013
2013 establishments in Colorado